Prabhakar Kore (born 1 August 1947) is an Indian politician and former a member of Rajya Sabha from Karnataka. He is a member of the Bharatiya Janata Party. He is the chairman of the Karnatak Lingayat Education Society, Belagavi which runs over 280 institutions that provide education and healthcare in Karnataka and Maharashtra, India. He is also Chancellor of KLE Academy of Higher Education and Research (KAHER), Belagavi and KLE Technological University, Hubballi.

References 

1947 births
20th-century Indian educational theorists
People from Belgaum
Living people
Rajya Sabha members from Karnataka
Bharatiya Janata Party politicians from Karnataka
Recipients of the Rajyotsava Award 2006